Drums Between the Bells is a collaboration album by Brian Eno and poet Rick Holland. It was released on 4 July 2011 on Warp Records in CD, double CD 'hardback', double vinyl and download editions. "Glitch" was released in advance of the album, through Eno's mailing list in April 2011.

In 2012 it was awarded a silver certification from the Independent Music Companies Association which indicated sales of at least 20,000 copies throughout Europe.

Background
Brian Eno met Rick Holland in the late 1990s, through the collaborative 'Map-Making' project. After creating their first music together in 2003, they met infrequently to work on new compositions. Following the release of Eno's Small Craft on a Milk Sea in 2010, the pair decided to complete their project. Drums Between the Bells is the result of their meetings (although their 2003 work does not appear on this album).

Critical reception

Track listing
All compositions by Brian Eno, with poems written by Rick Holland.
Disc one
"Bless This Space"
"Glitch"
"Dreambirds"
"Pour It Out"
"Seedpods"
"The Real"
"The Airman"
"Fierce Aisles of Light"
"As If Your Eyes Were Partly Closed As If You Honed the Swirl Within Them and Offered Me the World"
"A Title"
"Sounds Alien"
"Dow"
"Instant Gold" (iTunes Store bonus track)
"Multimedia"
"In the Future" (Japan CD bonus track)
"Cloud 4"
"Silence"
"Breath of Crows"

Disc two (instrumentals; limited edition only)
"Seeded"
"Pour"
"Bird Dreaming"
"Itch"
"Fiercer Aisles"
"Real"
"Spaced"
"Dense Air"
"Another Title"
"Nikkei"
"Cloud 5"
"Alienated"
"As If Your Eyes"
"Monomedia"
"Crows"

Personnel
As well as Eno and Holland, the album features the voices of Grazyna Goworek, Caroline Wildi, Laura Spagnuolo, Elisha Mudly Aylie Cooke, Nick Robertson, and Anastasia Afonina. Design and art direction, Nick Robertson. Imagery, Brian Eno & Nick Robertson

References

External links
Drums Between the Bells at Warp Records

2011 albums
Brian Eno albums
Collaborative albums
Warp (record label) albums
Rick Holland albums
Albums produced by Brian Eno